This is a list of the bird species recorded in Tristan da Cunha. The avifauna of Tristan da Cunha include a total of 93 species, of which 8 are endemic, and one is extinct.

This list's taxonomic treatment (designation and sequence of orders, families and species) and nomenclature (common and scientific names) follow the conventions of The Clements Checklist of Birds of the World, 2022 edition.

The following tags have been used to categorise some species:

(A) Accidental - a species that rarely or accidentally occurs in Tristan da Cunha
(E) Endemic - a species endemic to Tristan da Cunha
(Ex) Extinct - a species that no longer exists

Ducks, geese, and waterfowl
Order AnseriformesFamily Anatidae

Includes all but four species of Anseriformes. They are excellent at an aquatic life thanks to an oily covering on their feathers. 

Yellow-billed teal, Anas flavirostris (A)

Cuckoos
Order CuculiformesFamily Cuculidae

Cuckoos are found almost worldwide. They are highly variable in size, shape, colour, and habits.

Yellow-billed cuckoo, Coccyzus americanus (A)

Nightjars and allies
Order CaprimulgiformesFamily Caprimulgidae

Nighthawks belong to the same family as nightjars but are found only in the Americas. They have mottled or striped plumage for camouflage.

Common nighthawk, Chordeiles minor (A)

Rails, gallinules, and coots
Order GruiformesFamily Rallidae

Rails are usually secretive birds. Many island species are flightless and many of those have gone extinct in the last five centuries. Gallinules are less secretive, and are usually found near or on water.

Inaccessible Island rail, Atlantisia rogersi (E)
Paint-billed crake, Neocrex erythrops (A)
Tristan moorhen, Gallinula nesiotis (Ex)
Gough moorhen, Gallinula comeri (E)
Red-gartered coot, Fulica armillata (A)
Purple gallinule, Porphyrio martinicus (A)

Sheathbills
Order: CharadriiformesFamily: Chionididae

The sheathbills are scavengers of the Antarctic regions. They have white plumage and look plump and dove-like but are believed to be similar to the ancestors of the modern gulls and terns.

Snowy sheathbill, Chionis albus (A)

Plovers and lapwings
Order CharadriiformesFamily Charadriidae

Plovers are small to medium-sized wading birds found worldwide, which live both on coasts and inland. Two species have been recorded in Tristan da Cunha.

Common ringed plover, Charadrius hiaticula (A)
Rufous-chested dotterel, Charadrius modestus (A)

Sandpipers and allies
Order: CharadriiformesFamily: Scolopacidae

Scolopacidae is a large diverse family of small to medium-sized shorebirds including the sandpipers, curlews, godwits, shanks, tattlers, woodcocks, snipes, dowitchers and phalaropes. The majority of these species eat small invertebrates picked out of the mud or soil.

Upland sandpiper, Bartramia longicauda(A)
Whimbrel, Numenius phaeopus(A)
Ruddy turnstone, Arenaria interpres(A) 
Sharp-tailed sandpiper, Calidris acuminata 
Sanderling, Calidris alba(A)
White-rumped sandpiper, Calidris fuscicollis(A) 
Pectoral sandpiper, Calidris melanotos(A)
Red phalarope, Phalaropus fulicarius(A)
Spotted sandpiper, Actitis macularius(A)
Solitary sandpiper, Tringa solitaria(A)
Common greenshank, Tringa nebularia(A)
Lesser yellowlegs, Tringa flavipes(A)

Skuas and jaegers
Order: CharadriiformesFamily: Stercorariidae

The family Stercorariidae are, in general, medium to large birds, typically with grey or brown plumage, often with white markings on the wings. They nest on the ground in temperate and arctic regions and are long-distance migrants.

Chilean skua, Stercorarius chilensis (A)
Brown skua, Stercorarius antarctica 
Parasitic jaeger, Stercorarius parasiticus (A)
Long-tailed jaeger, Stercorarius longicaudus (A)

Gulls, terns, and skimmers
Order: CharadriiformesFamily: Laridae

Laridae is a family of medium to large seabirds, the gulls, terns, and skimmers. Gulls are typically grey or white, often with black markings on the head or wings. They have stout, longish bills and webbed feet. Terns are a group of generally medium to large seabirds typically with grey or white plumage, often with black markings on the head. Most terns hunt fish by diving but some pick insects off the surface of fresh water. Terns are generally long-lived birds, with several species known to live in excess of 30 years.

Franklin's gull, Leucophaeus pipixcan (A)
Kelp gull, Larus dominicanus (A)
Brown noddy, Anous stolidus
Arctic tern, Sterna paradisaea (A)
Antarctic tern, Sterna vittata

Tropicbirds 
Order PhaethontiformesFamily Phaethontidae
Tropicbirds are seabirds once thought to be closely related to pelicans but now known to belong in a clade known as Metaves. 

 Red-tailed tropicbird, Phaethon rubricauda (A)

Penguins
Penguins are southern ocean birds with only one species north of the equator. Small to large in size and mostly black and white in colour. 

King penguin, Aptenodytes patagonicus (A)
Gentoo penguin, Pygoscelis papua (A)
Chinstrap penguin, Pygoscelis antarcticus (A)
Macaroni penguin, Eudyptes chrysolophus (A)
Southern rockhopper penguin, Eudyptes chrysocome
Moseley's rockhopper penguin, Eudyptes moseleyi

Albatrosses
Order ProcellariiformesFamily Diomedeidae

Albatrosses are large tubenoses with wingspans of more than a meter. Most are southern ocean species but some are found in the north Pacific Ocean.

Yellow-nosed albatross, Thalassarche chlororhynchos 
Gray-headed albatross, Thalassarche chrysostoma 
White-capped albatross, Thalassarche cauta
Salvin's albatross, Thalassarche salvini (A)
Black-browed albatross, Thalassarche melanophris 
Sooty albatross, Phoebetria fusca
Light-mantled albatross, Phoebetria palpebrata 
Wandering albatross, Diomedea exulans

Southern storm-petrels

Order: ProcellariiformesFamily: Oceanitidae

The storm-petrels are the smallest seabirds, relatives of the petrels, feeding on planktonic crustaceans and small fish picked from the surface, typically while hovering. The flight is fluttering and sometimes bat-like. Until 2018, this family's three species were included with the other storm-petrels in family Hydrobatidae.

Wilson's storm-petrel, Oceanites oceanicus
Gray-backed storm-petrel, Garrodia nereis 
White-faced storm-petrel, Pelagodroma marina  
White-bellied storm-petrel, Fregetta grallaria 
Black-bellied storm-petrel, Fregetta tropica

Northern storm-petrels
Order: ProcellariiformesFamily: Hydrobatidae

Though the members of this family are similar in many respects to the southern storm-petrels, including their general appearance and habits, there are enough genetic differences to warrant their placement in a separate family.

Leach's storm petrel, Hydrobates leucorhoa

Petrels and shearwaters
Order ProcellariiformesFamily Procellariidae
Petrels and shearwaters are known collectively as tubenoses for the tubes on their beaks which they use for excreting salt. 

Southern giant-petrel, Macronectes giganteus
Northern giant-petrel, Macronectes halli
Southern fulmar, Fulmarus glacialoides
Cape petrel, Daption capensis
Kerguelen petrel, Aphrodroma brevirostris
Great-winged petrel, Pterodroma macroptera
Soft-plumaged petrel, Pterodroma mollis
White-headed petrel, Pterodroma lessonii
Juan Fernandez petrel, Pterodroma externa
Atlantic petrel, Pterodroma incerta
Blue petrel, Halobaena caerulea (A)
Broad-billed prion, Pachyptila vittata
MacGillivray's prion, Pachyptila macgillivrayi
Antarctic prion, Pachyptila desolata
Slender-billed prion, Pachyptila belcheri
Gray petrel, Procellaria cinerea
White-chinned petrel, Procellaria aequinoctialis
Spectacled petrel, Procellaria conspicillata 
Cory's shearwater, Calonectris diomedea (A)
Great shearwater, Ardenna gravis 
Sooty shearwater, Ardenna grisea
Subantarctic shearwater, Puffinus elegans 
Tropical shearwater, Puffinus bailloni 
Common diving-petrel, Pelecanoides urinatrix

Herons, egrets, and bitterns
Order PelecaniformesFamily Ardeidae
Herons are long-necked long-legged water birds. The majority feed on fish and other pond-life. Six species have been recorded in Tristan da Cunha.

Cocoi heron, Ardea cocoi (A)
Great egret, Ardea alba (A)
Snowy egret, Egretta thula  (A)
Little blue heron, Egretta caerulea (A) 
Cattle egret, Bubulcus ibis  (A)
Striated heron, Butorides striata (A)

Tyrant flycatchers
Order: PasseriformesFamily: Tyrannidae

Tyrant flycatchers are Passerine birds which occur throughout North and South America. They superficially resemble the Old World flycatchers, but are more robust and have stronger bills. They do not have the sophisticated vocal capabilities of the songbirds. Most, but not all, are rather plain. As the name implies, most are insectivorous. 

Eastern kingbird, Tyrannus tyrannus (A)

Swallows
Order: PasseriformesFamily: Hirundinidae

The family Hirundinidae is adapted to aerial feeding. They have a slender streamlined body, long pointed wings and a short bill with a wide gape. The feet are adapted to perching rather than walking, and the front toes are partially joined at the base.

Barn swallow, Hirundo rustica (A)
Cliff swallow, Petrochelidon pyrrhonota (A)

Leaf warblers
Order: PasseriformesFamily: Phylloscopidae

This widespread family consists of small, insectivorous birds that forage mainly in trees.

Willow warbler, Phylloscopus trochilus (A)

Thrushes
Order: PasseriformesFamily: Turdidae

The thrushes are a group of passerine birds that occur mainly but not exclusively in the Old World. They are plump, soft plumaged, small to medium-sized insectivores or sometimes omnivores, often feeding on the ground. Many have attractive songs.

Tristan thrush, Turdus eremita (E)

Tanagers
Order: PasseriformesFamily: Thraupidae

This large family includes the true tanagers, as well as a number of other species often referred to simply as "finches", although they are not members of the true finch family.

Gough Island finch, Rowettia goughensis (E)
Inaccessible Island finch, Nesospiza acunhae (E) 
Nightingale Island finch, Neospiza acunhae (E)
Wilkins's finch, Nesospiza wilkinsi (E)

See also
List of birds
Lists of birds by region

References

'
Tristan da Cunha
Tristan da Cunha